On January 26, 2020, a Sikorsky S-76B helicopter crashed in the city of Calabasas, California, around  northwest of Downtown Los Angeles, while en route from John Wayne Airport to Camarillo Airport. All nine people on board were killed: retired professional basketball player Kobe Bryant and his 13-year-old daughter Gianna; baseball coach John Altobelli, his wife Keri and daughter Alyssa; Payton Chester and her mother Sara;  basketball coach Christina Mauser; and the pilot, Ara Zobayan.

The accident was investigated by the National Transportation Safety Board (NTSB) which concluded that it was caused by continued VFR into IMC: the helicopter entered low cloud cover, which caused the pilot to lose his sense of orientation, and thence lose control.

Accident
On January 26, 2020, at approximately 9:06 a.m. PST (17:06 UTC), 9 passengers and crew departed from John Wayne Airport (SNA) in Orange County, California, in a 1991 Sikorsky S-76B helicopter, registration N72EX. They were heading to a basketball game at Bryant's Mamba Sports Academy in Newbury Park, where Bryant was scheduled to coach Gianna's team. Flight history records showed that the helicopter had flown the same journey the day before without incident to Camarillo Airport (CMA), a major general aviation airport about 20 minutes by car from Mamba Sports Academy. The previous day's flight had taken only 30 minutes; in contrast, driving from Bryant's home in Newport Beach to the academy would have taken at least 2 hours.

Weather conditions
A number of video recordings of the crash area were available, and although none showed the crash itself, the sound of the helicopter and the crash was recorded. In particular, surveillance cameras installed at the Agoura Pony Baseball Fields provided overlapping coverage of the final parts of the flight path. The FAA conducted a visibility study which used frequency analysis to determine when the aircraft made the closest approach to each camera, ground-speed, engine RPM and determine likely inflight visibility by comparing video recorded during the accident period to clear-sky imagery.
 
The Los Angeles Police Air Support Division had grounded its police helicopters on the morning of January 26 due to poor visibility and low ceiling; Air Support Division rules require at least  of visibility and an  cloud ceiling. Flying through clouds is possible if a pilot elects to operate under instrument flight rules (IFR), but the company's Part 135 operating certificate, issued in 1998, limited operations to on-demand VFR-only flights. Even if the company's operating certificate and rules had allowed for flying under IFR, that option could still have led to lengthy delays and detours (thereby using up any anticipated time savings) because of severe congestion in Los Angeles controlled airspace. Bryant's celebrity status would not have given the helicopter priority in that airspace.

Flight

On most of its previous flights to Camarillo, the helicopter had turned west at Downtown Los Angeles and flown over the Santa Monica Mountains until it picked up the Ventura Freeway (US 101). On January 26, that was not an option for VFR flights because of a deep marine layer which had pushed fog from the Pacific Ocean into the Santa Monica Mountains. Instead, the helicopter continued northwest, passed over Boyle Heights near Dodger Stadium and began following the route of the Golden State Freeway (I-5); as the flight approached Glendale, pilot Zobayan requested permission from the Burbank Airport air traffic controllers to transition to following the Ventura Freeway (US 101); Burbank controllers advised him that weather conditions around the airport dictated IFR and held the helicopter circling in a holding pattern for 11 minutes starting at 9:21 a.m. (17:21 UTC) before granting it permission to proceed into the controlled airspace around Burbank Airport. Burbank called Van Nuys, which was also operating under IFR, and Van Nuys advised Burbank to take Zobayan north of Van Nuys.

Permission to proceed was granted at 9:32 a.m. (17:32 UTC) under special VFR, requiring the pilot to stay under  altitude. The helicopter climbed to an altitude of  amsl, which Zobayan confirmed with Van Nuys at 9:35 a.m. (17:35 UTC). After proceeding through the Burbank controlled airspace, the flight turned west, following the Ronald Reagan Freeway (SR 118) as it passed into the Van Nuys Airport controlled airspace; the Van Nuys controllers shortly afterward approved a turn southwest towards the Ventura Freeway (US 101) at 9:39 a.m. (17:39 UTC).

SCT made its first contact with Zobayan at 9:40 a.m. (17:40 UTC), confirming the helicopter's altitude and continued operation under VFR conditions; SCT informed Zobayan that at the aircraft's current altitude and position, they would lose communication and radar contact shortly, advising him to ”squawk VFR” (transmit transponder code 1200) until he could contact Camarillo on the radio. By 9:42 a.m. (17:42 UTC), the helicopter had started following the Ventura Freeway west, entering more hilly terrain at the western edge of the San Fernando Valley. The SCT controller was relieved by a different controller at 9:43 a.m. (17:43 UTC). At 9:44:34 a.m. (17:44:34 UTC), Zobayan advised SCT that N72EX would be climbing above the cloud cover; the relieving SCT controller asked Zobayan to identify and asked if he were requesting flight following, a tracking service that would have provided the VFR flight with continuous verbal updates on air traffic. Zobayan confirmed that he was, and in response to a question about his intentions, advised air traffic control at 9:45:15 a.m.

According to transponder data, the helicopter first entered a climbing turn to the left, taking a southern heading and peaking at an altitude of  amsl ( above ground level (agl). Eight seconds later, at about 9:45:18 a.m. (17:45 UTC) the helicopter, continuing its left turn to the southeast, started to descend rapidly.

Impact and emergency response
The helicopter crashed and caught fire in Calabasas, California, near the intersection of Las Virgenes Road and Willow Glen Street, as reported by a 9-1-1 emergency call at 9:47 a.m. (17:47 UTC). The crash occurred on the New Millennium Loop Trail on a hillside behind the headquarters of the Las Virgenes Municipal Water District. The hillside is public land managed by both the water district and another government agency known as the Mountains Recreation and Conservation Authority  and forms part of a small valley that also happens to be the upper end of Malibu Canyon.

Much of the helicopter, cabin, cockpit and instrumentation were highly fragmented and destroyed by the impact and subsequent fire.

The helicopter came down between two groups of mountain bikers who called . Witnesses reported that the helicopter's engine was "sputtering" before the crash. Others reported seeing the helicopter flying into the ground at a "fairly significant rate of speed." It is unclear whether a distress call was made.

The crash started a  brush fire that was difficult to extinguish because of the presence of magnesium (which reacts with oxygen and water). Los Angeles County Fire Department firefighters responded to the scene and extinguished the fire by 10:30. The debris from the crash was scattered on steep terrain over a field estimated to extend . Firefighters hiked to the site and paramedics rappelled from a helicopter to the scene but could not locate any survivors; all nine occupants of the helicopter were killed in the crash. Based on examinations by the Los Angeles County Department of Medical Examiner-Coroner, all nine occupants died from blunt trauma.

Aircraft

The helicopter was a Sikorsky S-76B, registered N72EX. It was owned by Island Express Holding Corporation, based in Fillmore, California. Until 2015 it had been owned by the government of the state of Illinois, which used it to transport governors and other officials. The passenger compartment was converted from a configuration seating twelve (as N761LL) to eight after the sale to Island Express.

The aircraft did not have a flight data recorder (FDR) or cockpit voice recorder (CVR); helicopters in the U.S. are not required to carry them. Although the S-76B originally had a CVR installed, records show that Island Express removed the CVR shortly after acquiring the helicopter from the Illinois state government in March 2016. The helicopter was also not equipped with a terrain awareness and warning system (TAWS); although the NTSB recommended that all helicopters designed to carry six or more passenger seats be equipped with a TAWS after a 2004 S-76A crash, the FAA did not enforce the recommendation.

Bryant's company had chartered the helicopter from Island Express, via broker OC Helicopters (OCH). Bryant had started using Island Express in 2015, and Zobayan was his preferred pilot.

Reporting

The operations manager of OC Helicopters called the vice president of Island Express around 9:49 a.m., asking for the current location of the helicopter, as the flight tracking application Spidertracks had stopped tracking at 9:45 a.m. The vice president called the general manager of Island Express, who was unable to reach the pilot over VHF radio, and Island Express activated their Emergency Response Plan at 9:58 a.m. The company launched another helicopter to the site of the last tracked position from the Queensway heliport (in Long Beach) at 10:22 a.m., but the later flight was recalled at 10:27 a.m. after a crash had been confirmed at the site.

At 11:24 a.m., less than two hours after the crash, TMZ was the first news source to confirm Bryant's death. TMZ was later criticized by local law enforcement for reporting the story before the coroner's office had the opportunity to confirm the identities of the helicopter's occupants and inform their families. Los Angeles County Sheriff Alex Villanueva stated, "It would be extremely disrespectful to understand that your loved one had perished and you learn [that] through TMZ."

At 2:30 p.m., the Los Angeles County Sheriff and Los Angeles County Fire Department held a joint press conference detailing initial aspects of the crash. Los Angeles County fire chief Daryl Osby confirmed the Federal Aviation Administration and the National Transportation Safety Board (NTSB) were on the scene investigating. A "Go Team" consisting of 18 people, including specialists and investigators from the NTSB, arrived in the evening.

Sheriff Villanueva urged people to stay away because people had flooded into residential neighborhoods around the crash site and the traffic was getting in the way of responders. The Medical Examiner-Coroner was able to initially remove the remains of three of the nine victims overnight. In response to attempts at unauthorized access during the first evening after the crash, Sheriff Villanueva assigned deputies to patrol the rugged terrain on horseback and all-terrain vehicles in order to enforce a secure perimeter and prevent access by souvenir hunters. It was later reported that Los Angeles County sheriff deputies had taken and shared unauthorized graphic photos of the crash scene and were ordered by Sheriff Villanueva to delete the photographs to avoid discipline. The deletion of these photos led the Sheriff Civilian Oversight Commission to question whether that amounted to a cover-up.

It was reported the following day that the pilot was told that he was at a "too low level for flight following", which he had apparently requested, by air traffic controllers moments before the helicopter crashed into the hillside. This means that the helicopter was too low to be tracked by air traffic control, but does not necessarily mean that it was too low to fly safely.

By January 28, all nine bodies had been recovered from the crash site by the Medical Examiner-Coroner. The bodies of Kobe Bryant and three others were identified through fingerprints on January 28, and the five other bodies were identified on January 30 after DNA testing and analysis. Autopsies were conducted on January 28. By February 1, the Medical Examiner-Coroner had released most of the victims' bodies to their families, including the Bryants.

Legal actions
On February 24, 2020, Vanessa Bryant, Kobe Bryant's wife and the mother of Gianna, filed a wrongful death lawsuit against Island Express, the helicopter company that was transporting the 8 passengers, as well as the heirs of the estate of the pilot, Ara Zobayan. The Mauser and Altobelli families filed suit against Island Express in April, and the Chester family followed suit in May. Berge Zobayan, Ara's brother, responded to the original lawsuit in May, saying that Kobe was aware of the risks and faulted the negligence of the passengers. Island Express reiterated that Bryant was aware of the risks and disavowed responsibility, calling the crash "an act of God."

Island Express filed a cross-complaint lawsuit against two SCT air traffic controllers working for the FAA in August 2020, stating their "series of erroneous acts and/or omissions" caused the crash. That same month, Judge Virginia Keeny denied a motion filed by Zobayan's estate for a change of venue; the suit was filed in Los Angeles Superior Court and already had been assigned to a court in Van Nuys. Bryant amended her suit in September, naming OC Helicopters as an additional defendant, alleging the owner had checked and monitored weather conditions during the fatal flight.

As many as eight Los Angeles County Sheriff deputies who had responded to the crash took or shared pictures on personal devices; when Sheriff Villanueva learned about it, he ordered the deputies to delete the photographs. Although there was no official policy prohibiting photographs at an accident, Villanueva called it "inexcusable ... To have that on top of what they've already gone through is unconscionable" and apologized to the families while calling for a state law to prohibit unauthorized photographs. Vanessa Bryant also filed suit against the sheriff's office in September 2020 over the sharing of crash scene photographs. Mauser's family filed a similar lawsuit against the sheriff's office in December. United States District Court Judge John F. Walter ruled the names of the deputies suspended for misconduct could be released to the public in March 2021, which Vanessa Bryant revealed on March 15, 2021.

In November 2021, the Bryant family filed a lawsuit against Los Angeles County citing emotional distress. The Bryants' legal team claimed employees of Los Angeles County, including sheriff and firefighter personnel, took and shared images of the deceased bodies of the crash victims—including Kobe Bryant and his 13-year-old daughter. Court documents claim those who viewed the images described the bodies in crude terms. Los Angeles County had requested for the lawsuit to be dismissed. A hearing was scheduled for December 27, 2021. On January 5, 2022, U.S. District Judge John F. Walter dismissed Los Angeles County's request to dismiss the lawsuit, and a trial date was set. The trial took place in August 2022. During the trial, it was revealed a deputy sheriff allegedly referred to Bryant's dead body as a "pile of meat". The jury sided with the Bryant Family and awarded Vanessa Bryant 16 million dollars.  The jury also awarded 15 million dollars to co-complainant Chris Chester, whose wife Sarah and daughter Payton were killed in the crash.  The jury's verdict was unanimous, agreeing with Bryant, Chester, and their attorneys that the photos invaded the complainants' privacy and caused emotional distress.

NTSB investigation

A spokesperson for the National Transportation Safety Board said on January 31 that Island Express Helicopters, which owned the helicopter that crashed, was not certified to fly in foggy conditions.

On January 30, the wreckage of the helicopter was transported from Los Angeles to Phoenix, Arizona, for further analysis by NTSB investigators. However, the secure perimeter remained in place around the crash site, pending removal of hazardous materials (especially jet fuel and hydraulic fluids) by a private hazmat cleanup crew under the supervision of the California Department of Toxic Substances Control.

On February 7, the NTSB released an "investigative update" regarding the crash. Preliminary findings from the NTSB update show that there was no evidence of engine failure. The report indicates that "viewable sections of the engines showed no evidence of an uncontained or catastrophic internal failure" and that damage to the blades was "consistent with powered rotation at the time of impact."

On June 17, 2020, the NTSB released the public docket on the crash. It contained more than 1,700 pages "of factual reports on operations, survival factors, human performance, air traffic control, and aircraft performance. The docket also includes interview transcripts, photographs, and other investigative materials."

On February 9, 2021, the NTSB held a meeting to determine the probable cause of the crash. The Board concluded that Zobayan had flown into thick clouds, contrary to VFR requirements; the resulting spatial disorientation and loss of control led to the crash. Cited likely contributing causes were self-induced pressure by the pilot to complete the flight and the inadequate oversight of Island Express over its safety management process.  Flying at an excessive speed for the weather conditions was also mentioned in the final report. Even if the helicopter had been equipped with a terrain awareness and warning system, it was not likely to have helped to avoid the crash due to the pilot's disorientation. The "probable cause" reads:

Memorials

Around 200 people gathered at the foot of the hill close to the crash, with many wearing Bryant's jersey and holding basketballs. People also formed an impromptu memorial at the Staples Center, the home arena of the Los Angeles Lakers (the team which Bryant had played for during his entire 20-year NBA career, from 1996 to 2016) just hours before the arena was scheduled to host the 62nd Annual Grammy Awards. During the ceremony, host Alicia Keys and Boyz II Men performed "It's So Hard to Say Goodbye to Yesterday" in tribute to Bryant, and other performers, including Lil Nas X, Lizzo, Run-DMC, Aerosmith and DJ Khaled, incorporated tributes to Bryant in their performances. Bryant's two retired jerseys hanging in the rafters of the Staples Center were illuminated by spotlight. A week after Bryant's death, Staples Center staff began to clean up the makeshift memorial outside the arena, but promised to catalog, pack, and ship all nonperishable items to his family.  Among the items thus recovered were 1,350 basketballs, as well as "25,000 candles, 5,000 signs or letters, 500 stuffed animals, 350 pairs of shoes and 14 banners."

Fans created a memorial for Bryant outside of the Kobe Bryant Gymnasium at Lower Merion High School in Ardmore, Pennsylvania, which Bryant attended from 1992 to 1996. Jerseys, dedicated basketballs, teddy bears, flowers and candles were all laid down to memorialize Bryant.

Landmarks around the world, including the Los Angeles International Airport, Madison Square Garden, the Empire State Building and the Santa Ana Water tower in Bryant's home of Orange County, CA were lit purple and gold in Bryant's memory.

On February 2, the world's tallest building, Burj Khalifa, lit up with images in tribute to Bryant and his daughter. The display was arranged by the Executive Chairman of Dubai Multi Commodities Centre (DMCC) Ahmed Sultan Bin Sulayem.

On February 7, Kobe and his daughter were buried in a private funeral in Pacific View Memorial Park in the Corona del Mar neighborhood of Newport Beach. Two days later, Bryant was also featured, alongside other recently deceased figures from the film industry, in the In Memoriam montage at the 92nd Academy Awards on February 9. A celebration of life for Kobe and his daughter was held at Staples Center on February 24, 2020.

On February 10, a memorial service was held inside Angel Stadium in Anaheim, California, honoring John Altobelli, his wife Keri and daughter Alyssa.

On July 18, the Academy of Television Arts & Sciences posthumously awarded Bryant a Governor's Award at the 72nd Los Angeles Emmy Awards in recognition of "his legacy of philanthropy, community building and inspiration that extended beyond the basketball court." Composer John Williams, whom Bryant worked with on his animated short film Dear Basketball, accepted the award on his behalf. On January 26, 2022, on the 2nd anniversary of Kobe and Gigi's deaths, a statue of Kobe and Gigi was unveiled at Calabasas, California where the helicopter had crashed. The statue was left at the crash site for one day, allowing friends and fans alike to pay their respects to the victims of the crash. Dan Medina, artist of the statue, is looking for a permanent home for the lifesize version of the statue somewhere in downtown Los Angeles.

Reactions

Basketball

NBA Commissioner Adam Silver said in a statement:

Gregg Downer, Bryant's high school basketball coach, was "completely shocked and devastated" by the news and was initially too distraught to speak to the media. Downer coached Bryant at Lower Merion High School in suburban Philadelphia from 1992 to 1996 and won the state championship with Bryant in 1996.

Michael Jordan, to whom Bryant was often compared, said in a statement: "Words can't describe the pain I am feeling. I loved Kobe he was like a little brother to me... We used to talk often, and I will miss those conversations very much. He was a fierce competitor, one of the greats of the game and a creative force." Shaquille O'Neal, Bryant's Lakers teammate from 1996 to 2004 and with whom he shared a friendship and later a heavily publicized feud, said that he was "sick" and "had no words to express the pain." Several NBA teams paid tribute to Bryant during their games that night with intentional on-court violations referring to his uniform numbers: violations of the 24-second shot clock and the rule requiring teams to advance the ball past midcourt within eight seconds. Kareem Abdul-Jabbar posted a video on Twitter expressing his condolences. LeBron James, who had passed Bryant on the list of NBA career scoring leaders the previous night and had spoken to Bryant on the morning of the accident, posted a statement on Instagram, saying "I'm heartbroken and devastated ... I promise you I'll continue your legacy." Jerry West, Laker great and general manager who had orchestrated the deal to acquire Bryant for the Lakers, said that "I think the thing that resonates with me most... One person with one name Kobe you wouldn't have to mention his last name" and that it was the "saddest day of his life" to learn that the families in the helicopter crash had died.

Dallas Mavericks owner Mark Cuban said "that the number 24 will never again be worn by a Dallas Maverick." Several NBA players previously wearing Bryant's uniform numbers decided to change to new numbers in honor of Bryant.

The NBA later postponed the Los Angeles Lakers' game against the Los Angeles Clippers that had been scheduled for January 28, two days after the accident. The game was made up on July 30, the second game of the NBA's return from their suspension caused by the COVID-19 pandemic in North America. It was originally planned to be made up on April 9, but was postponed again due to the suspension. The game ended in a Lakers 103–101 comeback victory. On January 30, the first game after the crash was played at Staples Center between the Clippers and the Sacramento Kings, the Clippers honored Bryant before the game, by having Paul George narrate a video tribute to Bryant. The Clippers also uncovered Kobe's 8 and 24 retired jerseys as part of the tribute. Usually, the Clippers hide all of the Lakers' retired numbers and championship banners during their home games. The next day, the Lakers played their first game after the crash against the Portland Trail Blazers. Ahead of the match, Lakers paid tribute to Bryant and all who lost their lives in the crash with a ceremony held just before tip off, with Usher singing "Amazing Grace" and Boyz II Men, who performed at the Grammys 5 days prior to the Lakers' first game since the crash, singing the National Anthem, while Wiz Khalifa and Charlie Puth reunited to perform their hit "See You Again" at halftime. James also delivered a speech to the crowd before the game, and every starter in the Lakers starting lineup was announced with Bryant's name. The Lakers also wore a patch with Kobe's initials for the rest of the season. The Lakers home court also paid tribute to Kobe by placing "KB" logos on the back ends of the court, and Kobe's numbers on the sidelines, with his #8 near the Lakers bench, and his #24 near the visiting team's bench. The game was the second-most watched game in ESPN history, averaging 4.41 million viewers.

On February 15, commissioner Adam Silver announced that the NBA All-Star Game MVP Award would be renamed to the NBA All-Star Game Kobe Bryant Most Valuable Player in honor of Bryant. Also, in the 2020 NBA All-Star Game on February 16, each player on Team Giannis wore the jersey number 24, in honor of Kobe, while each player on Team LeBron wore the jersey number 2, in honor of Gianna.

Soon after the crash, the Basketball Hall of Fame in Springfield put Kobe's name on their large sign out front as fans left candles and flowers on the large statue of James Naismith in front of the entrance. A vigil and a moment of silence was held inside the shrine with many fans of Bryant and the Lakers in attendance, despite it being in a strongly Celtics fans region. In addition to the Hall of Fame turning the thousands of lights of the large sphere of the shrine itself purple and gold numerous other office buildings in downtown Springfield did as well. Several billboards on Interstate 90 in Massachusetts were also dedicated to the memory of Kobe Bryant. Bryant was also inducted into the Hall of Fame Class of 2020 along with Tim Duncan and Kevin Garnett as players on their first years of eligibility.

In May 2020, almost four months after the crash, Mamba Sports Academy reverted its name to Sports Academy by dropping the "Mamba" nickname out of respect to Bryant. After the Lakers won the 2020 NBA Finals, they dedicated the championship to Bryant.

On January 26, 2022, coinciding with the 2nd anniversary of his death and the helicopter crash, a statue of Kobe Bryant and his daughter Gianna was placed at the site where the crash occurred.

Other sports
Many Major League Baseball, National Football League, and National Hockey League players, teams and other organizations memorialized Bryant in the immediate aftermath of the crash.

News of Bryant's death broke just before kickoff of the 2020 Pro Bowl, with the players finding out in their locker rooms. Shortly after kickoff, Bryant's death was announced in the stadium and a moment of silence was held. ABC and ESPN broke away from their coverage of the event to cover the crash, and the player interviews focused heavily on the players' connections to, and respect for, Bryant. During pregame ceremonies for Super Bowl LIV the following week, players and coaches for both teams stood at both 24 yard lines, Bryant's number, during a tribute to Bryant and the other victims. With coverage of Bryant's death becoming a part of the game coverage, it was decided to end the Disney XD simulcast with nine minutes remaining in the second quarter and switch to a marathon of Big City Greens.

WWE paid tribute to Bryant during its 2020 Royal Rumble pay-per-view later that night, as did All Elite Wrestling during that week's AEW Dynamite in Cleveland with the Southern California-based stable SoCal Uncensored wearing Bryant jerseys to the ring, and many professional wrestlers expressed their condolences for the Bryant family.

Many ATP Tour tennis players paid tribute to Bryant during the 2020 Australian Open, including Novak Djokovic, who noted: "He was one of the greatest athletes of all time he inspired myself and many other people around the world."

A.C. Milan, Bryant's favorite soccer team growing up in Italy, wore black armbands in memory of him in their Coppa Italia match against Torino on January 28, 2020. A minute of silence was also held before the match. Many soccer players and teams paid tribute to Bryant during matches and on social media. On January 26, 2020, after scoring his second goal from penalty spot against Lille OSC, Neymar paid tribute to Bryant by striking out four fingers of his right and two fingers of his left hand to mark number 24 towards the camera and then by offering a prayer to the heavens. On February 27, 2020, before Los Angeles FC's home match against Club León in the CONCACAF Champions League, LAFC fans unveiled a tifo honoring the Bryants; team captain Carlos Vela also wore an armband with Kobe's initials and uniform numbers. On January 27, Super League Greece club AE Larissa retired number 24 from their roster indefinitely.

The NASCAR Cup Series' 2020 Auto Club 400 at Auto Club Speedway, located in nearby Fontana, California, featured various tributes from drivers and teams. Ryan Blaney and William Byron drove cars with special paint schemes honoring Bryant, with the former's being sponsored by Bodyarmor SuperDrink, a company of which Bryant was an investor. Sales of toy replicas of the cars were donated to philanthropic organizations connected to Bryant, with Byron's going to After-School All-Stars and Blaney's to MambaOnThree.org. Tyler Reddick's No. 8 car featured a tribute sticker, while Daniel Suárez raced with purple-and-gold gloves and shoes that were auctioned to support the Mamba On Three Fund. The track also painted a number 24 decal in the infield, while NASCAR conducted a pre-race ceremony to honor the victims.

Tiger Woods was informed of the tragedy by his caddie Joe LaCava after finishing his final hole at the Farmers Insurance Open, and stated in the post-round interview that Bryant "brought it each and every night on both ends of the floor. And not too many guys can say that throughout NBA history".

The following week's PGA Tour event was the Waste Management Open, an event that annually sees some of golf's most raucous crowds, particularly on the 16th hole. Several players, including Justin Thomas and Tony Finau, wore Bryant jerseys while playing the hole. On Sunday, the pin was placed 24 paces from the front and 8 paces from the left side in honor of Bryant's jersey numbers.

Formula One champion Lewis Hamilton posted on Instagram and Twitter paying tribute to Bryant, along with several other former and current drivers, while Renault F1 driver Daniel Ricciardo wore a purple racing helmet with "KB24" below the visor during the 2020 Formula One pre-season test. Chinese debutant Guanyu Zhou chose one of Bryant's jersey numbers, 24, as his race number to honour him.

In popular culture
American rappers Jay Electronica and Jay-Z recorded the somber track "A.P.I.D.T.A." on the night of the helicopter crash, later released as the final track on Jay Electronica's debut album A Written Testimony on March 13, 2020. ESPN's Elle Duncan shared an emotional story while she hosted the SportsCenter show on January 27, 2020, about how proud Bryant was of being a father to his daughters; Duncan recalled, amongst other things, Bryant telling her: "I would have five more girls if I could. I'm a girl dad." Duncan's story went viral and inspired other fathers across the world to celebrate their relationships with their daughters, using the hashtag #GirlDad.

Kanye West dedicated the song "24" from his album Donda to Bryant.

The accident was featured on season 22 of the Canadian documentary series Mayday, in the episode titled "Loss of a Legend".

See also

 List of accidents and incidents involving helicopters
 List of fatalities from aviation accidents
 Air China Flight 129, 2002 crash of a Boeing 767 in similar way in South Korea.
 Swan Aviation Sikorsky S-76 crash, 2017 crash of same model of helicopter in Turkey
 Kobe Bryant Day
 Death of Dale Earnhardt, another legendary athlete's death referred to as Black Sunday.

References

External links

 
  Auction and pictures of N761LL, the original registration of the helicopter involved
 
Kobe Bryant Crash: Risk By The Numbers by Paul Bertorelli, AVweb

NTSB videos
 
 
 

2020 in basketball
2020 in Los Angeles County, California
Accidents and incidents involving the Sikorsky S-76
Articles containing video clips
Aviation accidents and incidents in California
Aviation accidents and incidents in the United States in 2020
Aviation accidents and incidents involving controlled flight into terrain
Calabasas, California
January 2020 events in the United States
Death
Los Angeles Lakers
Sports-related aviation accidents and incidents
Aviation accidents and incidents caused by pilot error